The Romano R.4 was a French biplane reconnaissance floatplane built in 1927.

Specifications

References

Flying boats
1920s French military reconnaissance aircraft
R.4
Aircraft first flown in 1927